The following is a list of Dutch military equipment of World War II which includes artillery, vehicles and vessels. World War II was a global war that began in 1939 and ended in 1945. On 10 May 1940, Nazi Germany, which aimed to dominate Europe, invaded the Netherlands and occupied the entire country by 17 May. By 12 March 1942 the Dutch mainland and all their major colonies were controlled by Germans and Japanese. Dutch power was not restored until final Axis collapse in 1945. This list covers the equipment of armed elements centered on Royal Netherlands Army and Royal Netherlands East Indies Army, but not the Free Dutch Forces, which was equipped mainly by the Western Allies.

Knives and bayonets

Small arms

Pistols (manual and semi-automatic)

Automatic pistols and submachine guns

Rifles

Grenades and grenade launchers
See also: Dutch hand grenades

Machine guns

Infantry and dual-purpose machine guns
The Dutch army in 1940 was in the process of converting their machine guns to the unique 7.92x57mm rimmed cartridge. Exact numbers of machine guns converted is unknown.

Vehicle and aircraft machine guns

Artillery

Infantry mortars

Field artillery

Fortress and siege guns
See  for geographic distribution of coastal defenses and fortresses in continental Netherlands.
The listing below do include both army and land-based Navy weapons, but do not include 47mm guns, which are counted as anti-tank guns.
Bofors 37 mm, 45 or 50 calibers barrel length : 23 pieces, of them 12 imported and 11 license-produced
75mm guns, 40 calibers barrel length : 63 pieces (2 distinct Krupp types, 5000m range, rapid-fire)
120mm guns, 40 calibers barrel length : 18 pieces (2 distinct Krupp types, 12500m range, 9 RPM fire rate)
149.1mm or 152.4mm guns, 30 calibers barrel length: 5 (type unknown)
149.1mm or 152.4mm guns, 35 calibers barrel length: 6 (type unknown)
149.1mm or 152.4mm guns, 40 calibers barrel length: 21 (Krupp guns, 14200m range, 9 RPM fire rate)
240mm guns, 30 calibers barrel length: 11 (Krupp guns of the 19th century, 8000m range, 0.25 RPM fire rate)

Infantry guns

Anti-tank guns

Anti-tank weapons (besides anti-tank guns)
Solothurn S-18/1000

Anti-aircraft weapons

Light anti-aircraft guns

Heavy anti-aircraft guns

Vehicles

Tankettes
Carden Loyd Mk IV tankette - 5 tankettes used in Battle of the Netherlands

Tanks
Marmon-Herrington CTLS - few used against Japanese on Java. 28 used in the West Indies & Suriname
FT17 - 1 purchased in 1927 for trials
Marmon-Herrington CTMS - 26 used in the West Indies & Suriname
Marmon-Herrington MTLS - 19-20 used in the West Indies & Suriname
Carden-Lloyd Light Amphibious tank m1931- 2 delivered to the KNIL in 1937
Carden-Lloyd m1936 - 75 ordered but only 25 delivered to the KNIL
M3 tanks - 50 were being transported when the Dutch East Indies fell.

Armored cars

Utility tractor 

 VCL Utility Tracor - 50 ordered for the KNIL
Praga TIII/3 Artillery Tractor - 1 prototype delivered to the KNIL.

Engineering and command
 L180 (M-38) - 2 of 14 armored cars were built as command cars (dummy main gun made of wood).

Trucks
All numbers are for European part of Dutch armed forces.
horses 30000
Trado 1200 - mostly for towing artillery and 1 motorized light infantry division
DAF-139 amphibious truck (prototype testing at outbreak of war)
Ford Model AA 380 - in AA units
Ford GP - in Dutch East Indies cavalry units

Passenger cars
 unknown models (~70-140 total) for carrying officers

Motorcycles
 unknown model (at least 840 in 2 motorized cavalry regiments)

Miscellaneous vehicles
 bicycles (at least 1500000)

Navy ships and war vessels

Royal Netherlands Navy

At the moment of the German attack on 10 May 1940 the Dutch European Navy consisted of 50 vessels:
 1 light cruiser
 3 coastal defense ships
 10 destroyers
 12 minelayers
 4 minesweepers
 6 submarines
 14 auxiliary and light vessels

Also, 31 various vessels were under construction. Of these, 6 were eventually completed in England and 21 in Nazi Germany.

Present in the Dutch West Indies was the sloop Van Kinsbergen.

Destroyed or scuttled during Battle of the Netherlands: 
Destroyer Van Galen [Rotterdam, by a Stuka attack] 
Destroyer escort Christiaan Cornelis  (scuttled after being damaged by coastal artillery)
Destroyer escort Z3 (scuttled)
Destroyer escort G16 (scuttled)
Gunboat Johan Maurits van Nassau (sunk by Luftwaffe aircraft)
Gunboat Friso (sunk by Luftwaffe aircraft) 
Gunboat Brinio (scuttled)
Gunboat Braga (scuttled)
Gunboat Helfring (scuttled)
Gunboat Freyr (scuttled)
Minelayer Hydra
Minelyaer Bulgia 
Minesweeper Abraham van Hulst (heavily damaged by Luftwaffe aircraft attack and scuttled)
 Minesweeper Pieter Floriszoon (scuttled)
Minesweeper M III
Submarine HNLMS O 12 (scuttled)
Coastal defense ship HNLMS IJmuiden (scuttled)

Escaped to England during Battle of the Netherlands: 
Light cruiser Sumatra
Destroyer escort Z5
Destroyer escort Z6
Destroyer escort Z7
Destroyer escort Z8
Destroyer escort G13
Destroyer escort G15 
Gunboat Flores
Gunboat Gruno 
Minelayer Willem van der Zaan
Minelayer Medusa 
Minelayer Van Maerlant
Minelayer Douwe Aukes
Minelayer Nautiles
Minelayer Jan van Brakel
Minesweeper Jan van Gelder 
Torpedo boat TM51 
Submarine O9
Submarine O10
Submarine O13 
Light-cruiser Jacob van Heemskerck (under construction at outbreak of war) 
Destroyer leader Isaac Sweers (under construction at outbreak of war)
Submarine O21 (under construction at outbreak of war)
Submarine O22 (under construction at outbreak of war)
Submarine O23 (under construction at outbreak of war)
Submarine O24 (under construction at outbreak of war)
Many tugs, pilot boats and patrol boats

Captured by the Germans:
 Minesweepers MI (sunk and raised by Germans)
 Minesweepers MII (sunk and raised by Germans)
 Minesweepers MIV (sunk and raised by Germans)
 Gunboat Tyr
 Gunboat Balder 
 Gunboat Hadda (unarmed at outbreak of war)
 Gunboat Thor (unarmed at outbreak of war)
 Minelayer Vidar 
 Torpedo workship ''Vidar' '
 Submarines O 8
 Submarine O 11
 Coastal defense ship HMLMS Gelderland
 Coastal defense ship HNLMS Hertog Hendrik
 Cruiser De Zeven Provincien (under construction, not used by Germans) 
 Cruiser HNLMS Eendracht (under construction, not used by Germans) 
 Destroyer leader HNLMS Tjerk Hiddes (under construction, scrapped by Germans)
 Destroyer leader HNLMS Gerard Callenburgh (under construction, damaged and repaired by Germans)
 Destroyer leader HNLMS Philips van Almonde (under construction, scrapped by Germans)
 Submarine O 25 (under construction, finished by Germans)
 Submarine O 26 (under construction, finished by Germans)
 Submarine O 27 (under construction, finished by Germans)
 6 Minesweepers (under construction, names not assigned, all used by Germans) 
 Tanker (under construction, name not assigned, finished by Germans)
 10 Fast attack craft (E-boats) (under construction, names not assigned, all finished and used by Germans in Mediterranean)

Royal Netherlands Navy in the East Indies
At the time of Japanese attack on 7 December 1941, the Dutch Navy in the East Indies comprised 78 vessels.  Most of them were destroyed defending Java island:
3 light cruisers
7 destroyers
15 submarines
7 minelayers
11 minesweepers
35 auxiliary or small ships (of them 8 tankers)

Task Force One (Doorman; off Paternoster Island)
Light cruiser De Ruyter
Light cruiser Tromp
Destroyer Van Ghent
Destroyer Kortenaer
Destroyer Piet Hein
Destroyer Witte de With
Destroyer Banckert
Task Force Two (Sunda Strait en route Singapore)
Light cruiser Java
Destroyer Evertsen
Destroyer Van Nes
NEI Submarine Flotilla (at Surabaya)
submarine tender Zuiderkruis
SS K-VI
SS K-VIII
SS K-X
Submarine Division 1
SS O-16 (Karimata Strait)
SS K-XVII (north of Singapore)
SS K-XVII 
Submarine Division 2
SS K-IX
SS K-XI (north of Singapore)
SS K-XII (north of Singapore)
SS K-XIII (north of Singapore)
Submarine Division 3
SS K-XIV (South China Sea)
SS K-XV (South China Sea)
SS K-XVI (South China Sea)
Submarine Division 4
SS O-19 (South China Sea)
SS O-20 (South China Sea)
Mine Service (at Surabaya)
CM Gouden Leeuw (at Tarakan)
CM Prinz Van Oranje
CM Krakatau
CM Pro Patria (at Palembang)
CM Serdang
CM Willem van der Zaan (Lingga)
CM Rigel
Minesweeper Division 3
AMc Alor
AMc Aroe
AMc Bantam
AMc Bogor
AMc Ceram
AMc Cheribon
Minesweeper Division 4 (at Surabaya)
AMc Djember
AMc Djombang
AMc Djampea
AMc Enggano
AMc Endeh
Torpedo Division (at Surabaya)
PT TM-4 to TM-15 (12 vessels)
Tanker AO Aldegonda
Tanker AO Benakat (4763 tons, 10 knots)
Tanker AO Djirak (4325 tons, 10 knots)
Tanker AO Josefina
Tanker AO Juno (2741 tons, 9 knots)
Tanker AO Paula (2700 tons, 12 knots)
Tanker AO Pendopo (7150 tons, 10 knots)
Tanker AO Petronella
AT Kraus
AT Pief
AT Gina
AT Jules
AT Nolly
AT Tata
AT Flip
AT Rolf
AT Hector
AT Paul
AT Teddy
AR Moeara Boelian
AH Op Ten Noort

Aircraft
The Dutch before war have an extensive aircraft industry, but most of the aircraft produced were exported and not counted here.

Cartridges and shells
.32 ACP (7.94×25mm)
.380 ACP (9×25mm)
11mm French Ordnance (11.46×30mm)
6.5×53mmR (main rifle cartridge)
7.92×56R (main MG cartridge)
.303 British (7.7×56mmR)

References

External links
 Dutch army strategy and armament in World War II
 Order of battle of Netherlands East Indies Naval Forces at 7 December 1941

Dutch World War II